Ridge is a hamlet and census-designated place (CDP) in the town of Brookhaven, Suffolk County, New York, United States. The population was 13,336 at the 2010 census.

History

The Longwood Estate

In 1693, William "Tangier" Smith, who owned a homestead in Setauket, was allowed to purchase a large tract of land on the South Shore of Long Island in recognition of his being mayor of Tangier in Africa. He made his manor seat on the South Shore in present-day Mastic, and the northern part, now the south side of Ridge, was called "The Swamp" or "Longswamp". A house wasn't built at Longswamp until after the American Revolution. In 1817, William Sydney Smith inhabited the house and changed the name to Longwood.

In 1955, what then remained of William Smith's original manor was primarily located in Ridge and was surrounded by the world growing up around it, in the form of the Brookhaven National Laboratory and the surrounding areas becoming increasingly populated. Longwood's  fell into the hands of Elbert Clayton Smith, who immediately moved his family from California to live there. The Smith Estate was added to the National Register of Historic Places in 1981.

Randallville
In 1738, northern Ridge was settled by widower Samuel Randall of North Stonington, Connecticut; his only son Stephen Randall and his descendants farmed a  plot of ground that Samuel had always referred to as "the Ridge" based on the geographical terrain. First called "Randallville", Ridge was the name selected by its residents for postal delivery. The Randall burial plot near the William Floyd Parkway includes the grave of Lt. Stephen Randall (1736–1818), patriot of the American Revolution and a Suffolk County Militia veteran of the Battle of Long Island. Graves of Randall's wife Elizabeth Swezey (1747–1834) and several descendants are also within the plot.

Geography
Ridge is located at the northwestern end of the Long Island Central Pine Barrens and is referred to by a sign in the center of the hamlet as the "Gateway to the Pine Barrens".

Demographics

Demographics of the CDP
As of the census of 2000, there were 13,380 people, 5,545 households, and 3,476 families residing in the CDP. The population density was 993.6 per square mile (383.5/km2). There were 5,922 housing units at an average density of 439.8/sq mi (169.7/km2). The racial makeup of the CDP was 92.99% White, 3.45% African American, 0.28% Native American, 0.90% Asian, 0.03% Pacific Islander, 0.75% from other races, and 1.59% from two or more races. Hispanic or Latino of any race were 3.51% of the population.

There were 5,545 households, out of which 27.4% had children under the age of 18 living with them, 52.9% were married couples living together, 7.5% had a female householder with no husband present, and 37.3% were non-families. 34.4% of all households were made up of individuals, and 28.5% had someone living alone who was 65 years of age or older. The average household size was 2.38 and the average family size was 3.09.

In the CDP, the population was spread out, with 23.2% under the age of 18, 5.4% from 18 to 24, 24.5% from 25 to 44, 17.8% from 45 to 64, and 29.1% who were 65 years of age or older. The median age was 43 years. For every 100 females, there were 82.9 males. For every 100 females age 18 and over, there were 76.9 males.

The median income for a household in the CDP was $44,140, and the median income for a family was $60,039. Males had a median income of $49,539 versus $31,384 for females. The per capita income for the CDP was $23,387. About 4.4% of families and 6.5% of the population were below the poverty threshold, including 7.5% of those under age 18 and 6.0% of those age 65 or over.

Education

Media
Radio stations W293BT and WLIX-LP  are licensed to serve Ridge.
Transmitter facilities for WCBS-TV's translator station, and WLNY-TV are located in Ridge.

References 

 Lauer, Jean C. "The Longwood Estate." 1980.
 Lanyon, Genevieve Randall and Wells, Hazel Randall. "A Randall Family of Long Island, NY", 1989.

External links

 Longwood's Journey (Longwood Public Library):
 Ridge general history
 "The Elusive Legend of Icy Hollow", by Phil Mintz (Originally published in Newsday)
 Lake Panamoka history and Sales Brochure
 Lake Panamoka History (Lake Panamoka Civic Association)

Brookhaven, New York
Hamlets in New York (state)
Census-designated places in New York (state)
Census-designated places in Suffolk County, New York
Hamlets in Suffolk County, New York